Social Watch is a non-governmental organization that was established in 1995. Its secretariat and coordinating personnel is hosted by the Third World Institute, whose international seat is based in Montevideo, Uruguay.

Adopting a critical-liberal stance, Social Watch is focused on:
 the eradication of poverty and the causes of poverty,
 an end to all forms of discrimination and racism,
 an equitable distribution of wealth, and
 the realization of human rights, emphasizing ‘the right of all people not to be poor’.

On these fronts, Social Watch engages both United Nations-sponsored and related intergovernmental initiatives that address global governance issues, as well as simultaneously coordinating a vast network of grassroots activist—so-called ‘Watchers’ (over 80 in both North and South)--that monitor compliance with international covenants.

The practice of ‘Watching’ involves documenting and reporting on events, or failures to act (a kind of alternative journalism).  News  generated by Watchers in various countries  is regularly updated on the Social Watch website. Each year, their reports  are also condensed and compiled into an overall Social Watch Report,   widely distributed in intergovernmental and non-governmental organization circles, as well as back to the  grassroots communities of Watchers.

Publications
In 2011, Social Watch released the Basic Capabilities Index, a report on global development and human well-being.

In 2012, it published its most recent Gender Equity Index, one of the measures of gender equality.

In 2014, it published its annual Report, "Means and Ends."

References

External links
Official Website
Yearbook of International Organizations

Organizations established in 1995
Organizations based in Montevideo
Organizations based in Uruguay
Palermo, Montevideo